Kallur Subba Rao was an Indian freedom activist and politician. He was a scholar in Kannada and Telugu and a teacher by profession.

He was born in Kallur near Hindupur Taluk, Anantapur District. His Father’s name was Sri Surappa and his mother's name was Smt Puttamma. Kallur Subba Rao was born on 25 May 1897, and was the first person to start the Congress Movement in Rayalaseema. He studied up to 12th standard. When Subba Rao was 17-year-old, he attended a meeting hosted by Annie Besant. Thereafter, he started participating in other such meetings and became an active member of Indian Freedom Struggle. He was imprisoned for 7 years as a freedom fighter. After Indian independence, he was elected as a Member of Constituent Assembly of India from Madras Presidency. Afterwards, he was awarded Padma Shri in 1967.

He was a great poet and a very good orator. Rutherford, the then collector of Anantapur District, used to call him the "Lion of  Congress". Dr. Rajendra Prasad used to call him the "Prison Graduate" because Subba Rao was a great reader of Bhagavad Gita, Ramayana and Bhagavatha.

He was elected as a Member of Legislative Assembly three times. He was an Andhra Pradesh Congress Committee (APCC) General Secretary.

He died on 20 December 1973. A Special Cover on Sri Kalluri Subba Rao was released in Hindupur Division by Andhra Pradesh Postal Circle on 18.12.2021.

References

1897 births
1972 deaths
Members of the Constituent Assembly of India
Telugu people
Indian schoolteachers
People from Anantapur district
Deputy Speakers of the Andhra Pradesh Legislative Assembly
Recipients of the Padma Shri in social work
Indian independence activists from Andhra Pradesh
20th-century Indian educators
Educators from Andhra Pradesh